Vedavyasa Srinivasa Acharya (6 July 1940 – 14 February 2012) was an Indian senior leader of the Bharatiya Janata Party (BJP) in Karnataka. He was the Higher Education Minister in the Government of Karnataka.

Early life 
V.S. Acharya was born on 6 July 1940 in Udupi in a traditional Shivalli Madhwa Brahmin family. His parents were Vidwan Katte Srinivasa Acharya, a Sanskrit scholar & Smt. Krishnaveni Amma. After finishing his graduation in Medicine from the famous Kasturba Medical College, Manipal, he started his medical profession by opening a private clinic in Kalmadi, Udupi and earned fame as a good physician in the town. He married a fellow social worker Dr.Shanta Acharya and the couple had 4 sons and 1 daughter.

Political career 
Having been associated with the Rashtriya Swayamsevak Sangh from his childhood. He started his political career in the erstwhile Bharatiya Jana Sangh, the predecessor of the BJP. He was first elected as a municipal councillor and then, as president of the Udupi municipal council in 1968. This was the first ever victory of the Jana Sangh in an urban municipality in South India. The BJP leader Lal Krishna Advani later remarked that the Jana Sangh victory in the Udupi municipal council in 1968 laid foundation for the BJP rule in South India and particularly in the state of Karnataka. As the youngest municipal president of Udupi, he was hailed for his pro-active role in the development of the town. He remained municipal president for a period of 8 years and the Swarna river water supply system, Under ground drainage system, Town roads widening  etc.were some of his achievements during this period. Under his presidency Udupi Municipality in 1968 became first in nation to ban carrying night soil by humans.

During the Emergency (1975–77), he was imprisoned for a period of 19 months. After being released, he unsuccessfully contested the Lok Sabha elections from Udupi in 1977 and 1980. He was elected as a member of the Karnataka Legislative Assembly from Udupi constituency  in 1983 and was the floor leader of the BJP Legislature party. He was a Member of the Karnataka Legislative Council from 1996 until his death.

In the BJP-Janata Dal (Secular) coalition government headed by H.D.Kumaraswamy, he was Cabinet minister for Medical Education with additional charge of Animal Husbandry. Following the historic victory of the BJP in Karnataka in the 2008 state assembly elections, he was appointed the Home minister in the Yeddyurappa government.  He was considered as the second most important leader of the government after the Chief minister and was also the Leader of the House in the legislative council. As home minister, he was credited with the streamlining of administration and modernising of the police force in the state. Later, he was appointed the Higher Education minister in 2010.

Acharya was one of the most senior leaders of the BJP in Karnataka and as such, played an important role in the growth of the party in the state. He was president of the Dakshina Kannada district unit of the Jana Sangh (1974–77), Janata Party (1977–80) and BJP (1980–83). Also, he played a major role in the formation of the Udupi district in 1998. Known for his honesty, simplicity, dedication, wit and hard work, the soft-spoken Acharya was widely respected in the BJP and across party lines. As a loyal worker of the Rashtriya Swayamsevak Sangh, he remained committed to the ideology and discipline of the organisation and inspired thousands of BJP workers and leaders.

Death 
He died of a  heart attack on 14 February 2012. He was participating in a program when he suddenly collapsed. He died on the way to the hospital.

The Chief minister D.V. Sadananda Gowda described him as the conscience keeper of the BJP Government. Various other leaders like L.K. Advani and B.S. Yeddyurappa paid homage to him and praised the services rendered by Acharya to the party and the state.

References

External links 
The illustrious journey of V.S.Acharya
V.S.Acharya
V.S.Acharya's Blog

People from Udupi
Tulu people
Mangaloreans
1940 births
2012 deaths
Members of the Karnataka Legislative Council
Karnataka MLAs 1983–1985
State cabinet ministers of Karnataka
Bharatiya Jana Sangh politicians
Indians imprisoned during the Emergency (India)
Bharatiya Janata Party politicians from Karnataka
Karnataka municipal councillors
People from Chitradurga
Janata Party politicians